is a Japanese voice actress from Chiba Prefecture who is affiliated with Arts Vision. She played her first main role in 2018, voicing the character Elle Hoshino in the anime television series Dragon Pilot: Hisone and Masotan. She is also known for her roles as Junko Konno in Zombie Land Saga, Yakumo Saotome in Val × Love, Lia in Konosuba Fantastic Days, Kunai Zenow in Monster Girl Doctor, and Yuna in Kuma Kuma Kuma Bear.

Biography
Kawase was born in Chiba Prefecture on December 31, 1995. From her elementary school years, she had an interest in manga, which was influenced by her frequent visits to her aunt's house. She first discovered the voice acting profession after learning that a manga that she was reading was receiving an anime adaptation. During her second year in high school, her friends invited her to an event that had a voice actor as a guest speaker. At the time, she was more interested in the work being promoted itself than the guest, but after seeing the guest speak lines, she was impressed to the point of already looking for a voice acting training center after the event finished.

During her third year of high school, Makise enrolled at the Japan Narration Acting Institute, a school she chose because classes were held once a week and high school students were allowed to attend. She also worked part-time in order to pay for the tuition. During her studies, she was surprised to learn that voice actors were expected to learn how to sing and dance as well. After finishing her training program, she became affiliated with the talent agency Arts Vision after passing an audition. Her first voice acting role was in a mobile game, while her first main role was as the character Elle Hoshino in the 2018 anime television series Dragon Pilot: Hisone and Masotan. Later in 2018, she was cast in the role of Junko Konno in the anime series Zombie Land Saga.

In 2019, she played the role of Yakumo Saotome in the anime series Val × Love. In 2020, she provided the voice of Yuna, the protagonist of the anime series Kuma Kuma Kuma Bear, where she also performs the ending theme .

Filmography

Anime
2015
Shimajirō no Wow!
Case Closed as Student B (episode 784)

2017
Seiren as Customer (episode 9), Schoolgirl (episode 12)
A Centaur's Life as Towako Yachiyoda

2018
Dragon Pilot: Hisone and Masotan as Elle Hoshino
The Master of Ragnarok & Blesser of Einherjar as Ingrid
Zombie Land Saga as Junko Konno
The Girl in Twilight

2019
Boogiepop and Others as Shizuko Imazaki (episode 4)
Kaguya-sama: Love is War as Schoolgirl B (episode 5)
Domestic Girlfriend as Yanase (episode 12)
Fruits Basket as Schoolgirl (episode 2)
Why the Hell are You Here, Teacher!? as Ichiro Sato (young)
Vinland Saga as Askeladd (young; episodes 17 and 22)
Kandagawa Jet Girls as Kiriko Yoshitoku
Wasteful Days of High School Girls as Fine gal (episodes 5 and 6)
Val × Love as Yakumo Saotome
Didn't I Say to Make My Abilities Average in the Next Life?! as Marcela

2020
Major 2nd as Yayoi Sawa
Tamayomi as Chikage Asakura and Riko Shirai
Monster Girl Doctor as Kunai Zenow
Kuma Kuma Kuma Bear as Yuna
Talentless Nana as Detective

2021
Zombie Land Saga Revenge as Junko Konno
How Not to Summon a Demon Lord Ω as Tria
The Faraway Paladin as Will
Magia Record: Puella Magi Madoka Magica Side Story as Ryou Midori

2022
Aoashi as Hana Ichijō
Summer Time Rendering as Tokiko Hishigata
The Rising of the Shield Hero Season 2 as Yomogi Emarl
Lycoris Recoil as Fuki Harukawa
Duel Masters Win as Bowie Obochiyama
Bocchi the Rock! as Shima Iwashita

2023
Is It Wrong to Try to Pick Up Girls in a Dungeon? IV as Noin
The Ancient Magus' Bride Season 2 as Philomela Sergeant
Kuma Kuma Kuma Bear Punch! as Yuna

Video games
2018
Magia Record: Puella Magi Madoka Magica Side Story as Ryou Midori
Cytus II as Ivy
2020
Azur Lane as KMS Z2
KonoSuba Fantastic Days as Lia
2021
The Idolmaster Cinderella Girls as Tsukasa Kiryu
The Idolmaster Cinderella Girls: Starlight Stage as Tsukasa Kiryu
WACCA Reverse as Luin
Blue Reflection: Second Light as Rena Miyauchi
2022
Blue Archive as Shigure Mayoi
2023
Disgaea 7 as Suisen
Loop8: Summer of Gods as Machina

References

External links
Agency profile 

1995 births
Japanese voice actresses
Living people
Voice actresses from Chiba Prefecture